The Shire of Mornington Peninsula is a local government area in southeastern Metropolitan Melbourne, Victoria, Australia. It is located to the south of the Melbourne City Centre. It has an area of 724 square kilometres and in June 2018 it had a population of 165,822.

History
The Mornington Peninsula Shire came into existence on 15 December 1994 when the state government amalgamated the previous Shires of Flinders, Hastings and Mornington.

On August 13, 2019, the Shire voted to declare a climate emergency in response to other similar declarations from councils around Australia.

The Shire abolished the 150-year-old tradition of reciting a prayer before Council meetings in December 2020. According to the Australian National Secular Lobby, the Shire was the first council or parliament to be removed from their list of government institutions that impose prayers on elected representatives”.

Council

Electoral representation 
The Mornington Peninsula Shire is split into six wards and eleven Councillors. The six wards are Briars, Cerberus, Nepean, Red Hill, Seawinds and Watson. The current council, as of December 2020, is:

Townships and localities
The 2021 census, the shire had a population of 168,948 up from 154,999 in the 2016 census

^ - Territory divided with another LGA
* - Not noted in 2016 Census

See also
 List of Melbourne suburbs, for other Melbourne suburbs and municipalities''
 Mornington Peninsula and Western Port Biosphere Reserve

References

External links
 
Mornington Peninsula Shire web site
Metlink local public transport map
Link to Land Victoria interactive maps

Local government areas of Melbourne
Greater Melbourne (region)